MyLife is an American information brokerage firm. The firm was founded by Jeffrey Tinsley in 2002 as Reunion.com and changed names following the 2008 merger with Wink.com.

MyLife gathers personal information through public records and other sources to automatically generate a "MyLife Public Page" for each person. A MyLife public page can list a wide variety of personal information, including an individual's age, past and current home addresses, phone numbers, email addresses, employers, education, photographs, relatives, political affiliations, a mini biography, and a personal review section which encourages other MyLife members to rate each other. MyLife claims to provide public background data on over 325 million identities. Public pages can be edited or removed by email/phone request without paying. The site also allows people to search for any person in the United States, read their auto-generated public page, and review it.

History
In 2007, MyLife.com received $25 million in venture funding from Oak Investment Partners. The company changed its name from Reunion.com to MyLife.com after merging with the search engine company, Wink in the fall of 2008. According to Tinsley, the company's 2008 revenue was estimated at 52 million dollars with 90% of the firm's revenue coming from paid subscriptions. As of 2009, the company had acquired several smaller companies including Planet Alumni, GoodContacts, HighSchoolAlumni, and MyAddressBook.com. In 2009 Ancestry.com began a data sharing partnership with MyLife.

In August 2007, MyLife described its website as the sixth most popular social networking site with 28 million users, while a 2008 article in the Los Angeles Times criticized the company's "aggressive marketing approach." In February 2009 ComScore reported the company's website as having 18.2 million unique visitors that month, and Tech Crunch said it was the fourth largest social networking website in January 2009.

Legal issues 
In 2011, a lawsuit against MyLife said the company was engaging in false advertising practices, similar to what was alleged in a 2008 classmates.com class-action lawsuit. The suit also accused the MyLife of false solicitation by offering monthly memberships and then charging member's credit cards at the annual rate. The class action accused MyLife of spamming contacts improperly gathered from the address books of those visiting the site. U.S. District Judge Claudia Wilken's ruling consolidated the 2011 class-action lawsuit with two other fraud class actions against MyLife. Ultimately the lawsuit was dismissed.

The Washington State Attorney General's Office began an investigation in 2011 stemming from concerns that the company's TV advertisements may have violated the state's Consumer Protection Act, which prohibits unfair and deceptive practice. According to State officials the company resolved the issue by making an "assurance of discontinuance" and paid $28,000 in attorneys' costs and fees.

In 2015, after a joint investigation by the Santa Monica City Attorney's Office and the Los Angeles County District Attorney's Office the company was again sued, this time for allegedly violating California anti-spam laws. Investigators found that MyLife was tricking consumers into giving the company their personal identifying information, and later their money, through false and misleading ads. MyLife agreed to a court judgment under which it would pay $800,000 in penalties, plus $250,000 in refunds to customers, a ruling referred to as "the first major prosecution of an online business for violations of California's automatic renewal law". The company also is subject to a permanent injunction that prohibits false advertising and unauthorized credit card charges.

In July 2020, the U.S. Department of Justice, on behalf of the Federal Trade Commission, filed a lawsuit against MyLife and Tinsley. In the complaint the company is alleged to have violated the Fair Credit Reporting Act (FCRA) and used misleading billing and marketing practices. Additionally, the lawsuit mentions that the company deceived consumers with "teaser background reports" which made false claims of information about arrest, criminal, and sex offender records. In October 2021, a judge issued a summary judgement ruling that MyLife engaged in deceptive acts, as well as violating the Telemarketing Sales Rule and the Restore Online Shoppers’ Confidence Act (ROSCA). However, the judge denied the FCRA claim as well as any claim that Tinsley was individually liable. The company was also banned from engaging in negative option billing as well as implying that someone who has received a traffic violation has a criminal record. As a result, the court awarded $34 million in consumer reparations. However, due to the MyLife's financial position and inability to pay Tinsley will pay $5 millions and MyLife $16 million.

Ratings and reviews
The Better Business Bureau (BBB) rates MyLife as a 'C-' with no accreditation . Formerly, the BBB revoked MyLife's accreditation, initially giving MyLife a rating of D, and later an F. From 2018 to 2020, the BBB received almost 14,000 complaints about MyLife.

A key criticism of MyLife is the difficulty of "opting out" as well as having personal information removed from its website. There has been criticism related to marketing tactics used to entice potential customers to begin a membership.

References

American social networking websites
Internet properties established in 2002
Privately held companies of the United States
Online person databases